Maternity is a dramatic three act play that opened January 6, 1915, at the Princess Theatre on Broadway starring Richard Bennett.

An English language version of Eugène Brieux's French play, Maternité (1904), the work was translated by Benjamin F. Blanchard. The play's book was adapted by Richard Bennett, whose Purpose Play Society produced.

Unlike Damaged Goods, Bennett's previous socially conscious play by Brieux, Maternity was not an artistic or financial success. Despite special matinées, which were well patronized in the final week, the production ran for only 21 performances before closing.

Synopsis
Maternity deals with out-of-wedlock birth and the relations of motherhood to society.

Opening night cast

References

External links
Maternity at the Internet Broadway Database

American plays
Broadway plays
Plays based on other plays
1915 plays